The Greenbury Report released in 1995 was the product of a committee established by the United Kingdom Confederation of British Industry on corporate governance. It followed in the tradition of the Cadbury Report and addressed a growing concern about the level of director remuneration. The modern result of the report is found in the UK Corporate Governance Code at section D.

Some of the recommendation of the committee included the following.

See also
 UK Corporate Governance Code (2012)
 Cadbury Report (1992)
 Hampel Report (1998)
 Turnbull Report
 Higgs Report (2003)
 Smith Report (2003)

Notes

External links
 Full text of the combined code 2006 
 Full text of the combined code 2003
 The Financial Services Authority Listing Rules online and in pdf format, under which there is an obligation to comply with the Combined Code, or explain why it is not complied with, under LR 9.8.6(6).
 The Financial Reporting Council's website

1995 in the United Kingdom
Reports on finance and business
1995 in economics